Alemannic Separatism is a historical movement of separatism of the Alemannic-German-speaking areas of Austria, France, and Germany (viz., South Baden, Swabia (viz. most of Württemberg and Bavarian Swabia), Alsace and Vorarlberg), aiming at a unification with the Swiss Confederacy (later Switzerland). The historic origins of the movement lay in the Napoleonic era (ca. 1805–1815) and it was briefly revived both after the end of World War I (1919) and after the end of World War II (1946–1952).

Alemannic  dialects 

The term "Alemannic" for the group of High German dialects was introduced by Johann Peter Hebel in 1803, who named them for the Alamanni tribes of the Migration period.
The Alemannic-speaking areas of Germany were separated into Baden and Württemberg, parts of Swabia were integrated into Bavaria in 1805; the Alemannic dialects were not the only dialects in those states (e.g. in Baden and Württemberg the Northern parts speak a 
Rhine Franconian dialects, East Franconian German as well as South Franconian German and in Bavaria there are 
Bavarian dialects as well as Rhine Franconian dialects, East Franconian German as well as South Franconian German.

Separatism 
Alemannic dialects were marginalized under a non-Alemannic administration. Alemannic separatism arose in the context of the resistance of the rural population of Baden against Napoleonic rule within the Confederation of the Rhine (1806–1813).

After World War I, on 11 May 1919, the population of Vorarlberg within the short-lived state of Deutschösterreich (German Austria) voted for secession to Switzerland with 81% of the popular vote. The request was denied both by the government in Vienna and by Switzerland. Similar tendencies in Baden and Württemberg were repressed before a vote was taken. 

After the end of World War II, there was a political movement in southern Alsace and South Baden, originating from resistance movements against the Nazi regime, which aimed for the creation of a separate Alemannic state together with the Swiss canton of Basel.
Otto Feger  (1946) suggested a decentral organization of a "Swabian-Alemannic democracy" inspired by the Swiss model of direct democracy, while Bernhard Dietrich, mayor of Singen, aimed at a larger "Alpine union" which was to include also Bavarian speaking territories (e.g. Bavaria and Austria) and the German-speaking parts of the Swiss Confederation. Feger's 1946 Schwäbisch-Alemannische Demokratie with 240,000 copies was the most-printed book in French-administered Germany (1945–1949).
The organisational backbone of Alemannic separatism was the Schwäbisch-Alemannischer Heimatbund, but the French administration was unsympathetic and refused the permission required for the foundation of a political party with the aim of such an Alemannic state. The current Bundesland Baden-Württemberg within the Federal Republic of Germany was founded in 1952, effectively ending any serious political scenarios of Alemannic separatism, although the concept remains alive as a nostalgic sentiment rather than a political program. This is particularly true in South Baden, which was the only region where the majority of people voted against unification with Württemberg in the 1951 plebiscite that was held to authorize the unification in accordance with Article 29 of the new West German constitution, the Grundgesetz. The overall vote was however in favour of the creation of the new Südweststaat (Southwest Land).

See also

Alsace independence movement
Duchy of Swabia
Schwabenhass
Enlargement of Switzerland
Jurassic separatism
Switzerland as a federal state

References
 Otto Feger: Schwäbisch-alemannische Demokratie: Aufruf und Programm. Weller, Konstanz 1946.
 Heiko Haumann: „Schwäbisch-alemannische Demokratie“ gegen „Staufisch-schwäbischen Imperialismus“? Politische Konzeptionen in Baden und Württemberg 1945–1952. In: Allmende. Zeitschrift für Literatur. Bd. 8, Nr. 20, Karlsruhe 1988, 36–52, ISSN 0720-3098.
 Manfred Joss: Schwäbisch-Alemannische Demokratie. Vision und Scheitern eines Separatstaats im deutschen Südwesten nach dem Zweiten Weltkrieg. Lizentiatsarbeit, Historisches Institut, Universität Bern 2005.
 Jürgen Klöckler: „Das Land der Alemannen …“. Pläne für einen Heimatstaat im Bodenseeraum nach 1945. UVK Verlagsgesellschaft, Konstanz 1999,   .

Independence movements
Stateless nationalism in Europe
Separatism in Austria
Separatism in France
Separatism in Germany
Politics of Alsace
History of Vorarlberg
Baden-Württemberg
History of Alsace
Alemannic German language